Louis Diage (July 22, 1905 – October 9, 1979) was an American set decorator. He was nominated for three Academy Awards in the category Best Art Direction.

Selected filmography
Diage was nominated for three Academy Awards for Best Art Direction:

 The Solid Gold Cadillac (1956)
 Pal Joey (1957)
 Bell, Book and Candle (1958)

References

External links

American set decorators
People from Illinois
1905 births
1979 deaths